Northern Behesht-e-Zahra Highway is an expressway in northern part of Behesht-e Zahra Cemetery connecting Tehran-Qom Highway to Freeway.

Expressways in Tehran